WCIS may refer to:

 WCIS (AM), a radio station (760 AM) licensed to serve Morganton, North Carolina, United States
 WCIS-FM, a radio station (105.1 FM) licensed to serve Deruyter, New York, United States
 Wellington College International Shanghai